The 1992–93 NBA season was the Bucks' 25th season in the National Basketball Association. The Bucks received the eighth pick in the 1992 NBA draft, and selected Todd Day from the University of Arkansas. During the off-season, the team acquired Blue Edwards and second-year guard Eric Murdock from the Utah Jazz, and hired Mike Dunleavy as their new Head Coach and General Manager. The Bucks got off to a strong start, winning 10 of their first 13 games. However, they would struggle as they went on an 11-game losing streak in December, then posted a 7-game losing streak in January, and held a 20–31 record at the All-Star break, as Moses Malone only played just eleven games due to a back injury. At midseason, the team traded Alvin Robertson to the Detroit Pistons in exchange for Orlando Woolridge, who only played in just eight games for the team due to a broken hand injury, while the team signed free agent Derek Strong. The Bucks lost their final eight games of the season, finishing last place in the Central Division with a disappointing 28–54 record.

Edwards and Frank Brickowski both led the Bucks in scoring averaging 16.9 points per game each, with Brickowski averaging 6.1 rebounds per game and Edwards contributing 1.6 steals per game, while Murdock provided the team with 14.4 points, 7.6 assists and 2.2 steals per game, and finished in second place in Most Improved Player voting. In addition, Day averaged 13.8 points per game, but was not selected to an All-Rookie Team at season's end, while rookie forward Anthony Avent contributed 9.8 points and 6.2 rebounds per game, and Brad Lohaus provided with 9.1 points per game off the bench.

Following the season, Malone and Woolridge both left for free agency and signed with the Philadelphia 76ers, whom Malone used to play for, and with Woolridge signing during the next season, and Fred Roberts was released.

Draft picks

Roster

Roster Notes
 Point guard Sam Vincent missed the entire season due to a ruptured Achilles tendon, and never played for the Bucks.

Regular season

Season standings

y - clinched division title
x - clinched playoff spot

z - clinched division title
y - clinched division title
x - clinched playoff spot

Record vs. opponents

Game log

|-style="background:#bbffbb;"
| 1 || November 6, 1992 || @ Detroit
| W 86—81
|Frank Brickowski (19)
|Frank Brickowski, Alvin Robertson (7)
|Eric Murdock (8)
| The Palace of Auburn Hills21,454
| 1–0
|-style="background:#bbffbb;"
| 2 || November 7, 1992 || Boston
| W 124–88
|Blue Edwards (30)
|Anthony Avent (10)
|Eric Murdock (9)
| Bradley Center17,892
| 2–0
|-style="background:#fcc;"
| 3 || November 10, 1992 || @ San Antonio
| L 98–104
|Brad Lohaus, Alvin Robertson (19)
|Brad Lohaus (9)
|Eric Murdock (11)
| HemisFair Arena16,057
| 2-1
|-style="background:#bbffbb;"
| 4 || November 11, 1992 || @ Dallas
| W 124–116
|Blue Edwards (31)
|Anthony Avent, Frank Brickowski (8)
|Eric Murdock (8)
| Reunion Arena11,276
| 3–1
|-style="background:#fcc;"
| 5 || November 13, 1992 || Chicago
| L 96–101
|Eric Murdock (25)
|Frank Brickowski (10)
|Eric Murdock (9)
| Bradley Center18,633
| 3–2
|-style="background:#bbffbb;"
| 6 || November 15, 1992 || Denver
| W 115–98
|Blue Edwards (32)
|Blue Edwards (9)
|
| Bradley Center14,882
| 4–2
|-style="background:#bbffbb;"
| 7 || November 17, 1992 || @ Atlanta
| W 114—106
|
|
|
| The Omni7,771
| 5–2
|-style="background:#bbffbb;"
| 8 || November 21, 1992 || Indiana
| W 105–95
|
|
|
| Bradley Center18,214
| 6–2
|-style="background:#fcc;"
| 9 || November 24, 1992 || @ Cleveland
| L 105–109
|
|
|
| Richfield Coliseum15,312
| 6-3
|-style="background:#bbffbb;"
| 10 || November 25, 1992 || Cleveland
| W 94–85
|
|
|
| Bradley Center15,634
| 7–3
|-style="background:#bbffbb;"
| 11 || November 27, 1992 || @ Philadelphia
| W 86—81
|
|
|
| The Spectrum11,831
| 8–3
|-style="background:#bbffbb;"
| 12 || November 28, 1992 || Washington
| W 97–95
|
|
|
| Bradley Center18,028
| 9–3

|-style="background:#bbffbb;"
| 13 || December 2, 1992 || Miami
| W 100–97
|
|
|
| Bradley Center14,516
| 10–3
|-style="background:#fcc;"
| 14 || December 3, 1992 || @ Washington
| L 95–113
|
|
|
| Capital Centre7,711
| 10-4
|-style="background:#fcc;"
| 15 || December 5, 1992 || @ New York
| L 95–113
|
|
|
| Madison Square Garden19,763
| 10-5
|-style="background:#fcc;"
| 16 || December 6, 1992 || Phoenix
| L 112–122
|
|
|
| Bradley Center16,646
| 10–6
|-style="background:#fcc;"
| 17 || December 8, 1992 || @ Portland
| L 97–126
|
|
|
| Memorial Coliseum12,888
| 10–7
|-style="background:#fcc;"
| 18 || December 10, 1992 || @ Golden State
| L 102–114
|
|
|
| Oakland Arena15,025
| 10–8
|-style="background:#fcc;"
| 19 || December 12, 1992 || @ Utah
| L 82–108
|
|
|
| Delta Center19,911
| 10–9
|-style="background:#fcc;"
| 20 || December 13, 1992 || @ L. A. Lakers
| L 96–114
|
|
|
| The Forum13,265
| 10–10
|-style="background:#fcc;"
| 21 || December 15, 1992 || @ Seattle
| L 100–108
|
|
|
| Seattle Center Coliseum10,327
| 10–11
|-style="background:#fcc;"
| 22 || December 17, 1992 || New Jersey
| L 101–102
|
|
|
| Bradley Center13,986
| 10–12
|-style="background:#fcc;"
| 23 || December 19, 1992 || Detroit
| L 90–103
|Blue Edwards (26)
|Frank Brickowski (10)
|Lee Mayberry, Alvin Robertson (5)
| Bradley Center17,264
| 10–13
|-style="background:#fcc;"
| 24 || December 22, 1992 || Sacramento
| L 99–102
|Eric Murdock (30)
|Eric Murdock (15)
|Alvin Robertson (6)
| Bradley Center14,536
| 10–14
|-style="background:#bbffbb;"
| 25 || December 26, 1992 || New York
| W 102–100 OT
|Todd Day (22)
|Anthony Avent (9)
|Frank Brickowski. Blue Edwards (6)
| Bradley Center17,862
| 11–14
|-style="background:#fcc;"
| 26 || December 28, 1992 || @ Orlando
| L 94–110
|
|
|
| Orlando Arena15,151
| 11–15

|-style="background:#bbffbb;"
| 27 || January 2, 1993 || @ Atlanta
| W 106–93
|
|
|
| Omni Coliseum14,349
| 12–15
|-style="background:#bbffbb;"
| 28 || January 3, 1993 || L. A. Lakers
| W 109–101
|
|
|
| Bradley Center15,881
| 13–15
|-style="background:#bbffbb;"
| 29 || January 5, 1993 || Minnesota
| W 114–100
|
|
|
| Bradley Center14,085
| 14–15
|-style="background:#fcc;"
| 30 || January 7, 1993 || Atlanta
| L 94–100
|
|
|
| Bradley Center15,124
| 14–16
|-style="background:#fcc;"
| 31 || January 8, 1993 || @ Chicago
| L 95–120
|
|
|
| Chicago Stadium15,124
| 14–17
|-style="background:#fcc;"
| 32 || January 10, 1993 || L. A. Clippers
| L 99–104
|
|
|
| Bradley Center14,034
| 14–18

|-style="background:#fcc;"
| 45 || February 7, 1993 || New Jersey
| L 102–102
|
|
|
| Bradley Center18,633
| 18–27

|-style="background:#bbffbb;"
| 56 || March 2, 1993 || Dallas
| W 120–86
|
|
|
| Bradley Center13,794
| 22–34
|-style="background:#bbffbb;"
| 57 || March 5, 1993 || Orlando
| W 109–91
|
|
|
| Bradley Center18,633
| 23–34

|-style="background:#fcc;"
| 82 || April 24, 1993 || Charlotte
| L 106–108
|
|
|
| Bradley Center18,633
| 28–54

Player statistics

Awards and records

Transactions

Trades

Free agents

Player Transactions Citation:

References

See also
 1992-93 NBA season

Milwaukee Bucks seasons
Milwaukee Bucks
Milwaukee Bucks
Milwaukee